Mayville is a village in Tuscola County, in the U.S. state of Michigan. The population was 950 at the 2010 census.  The village is within Fremont Township along the boundary with Dayton Township.

Geography
Mayville is home to one public school system, grades K-12, the 'Mayville Wildcats' include students from the nearby towns of Silverwood and Fostoria. The village was founded in 1865 by Dexter Choat.

Demographics

In 2010 Mayville was awarded an energy improvement grant by the U.S. Department of Energy. A total of 43 grants were distributed under the American Recovery and Reinvestment Act to improve the nation's energy security.

2010 census
As of the census of 2010, there were 950 people, 369 households, and 235 families living in the village. The racial makeup of the village was 96.1% White, 0.5% African American, 0.2% Native American, 0.2% Asian, 0.5% from other races, and 2.4% from two or more races. Hispanic or Latino of any race were 2.5% of the population.

There were 369 households, of which 33.6% had children under the age of 18 living with them, 43.9% were married couples living together, 13.3% had a female householder with no husband present, 6.5% had a male householder with no wife present, and 36.3% were non-families. 32.0% of all households were made up of individuals, and 12.7% had someone living alone who was 65 years of age or older. The average household size was 2.43 and the average family size was 3.05.

The median age in the village was 41.1 years. 25.4% of residents were under the age of 18; 7.4% were between the ages of 18 and 24; 21.9% were from 25 to 44; 25% were from 45 to 64; and 20.1% were 65 years of age or older. The gender makeup of the village was 47.4% male and 52.6% female.

2000 census
As of the census of 2000, there were 1,055 people, 402 households, and 281 families living in the village. The racial makeup of the village was 97.73% White, 0.47% African American, 0.19% Asian, and 1.61% from two or more races. Hispanic or Latino of any race were 1.14% of the population.

There were 402 households, out of which 35.1% had children under the age of 18 living with them, 52.2% were married couples living together, 13.7% had a female householder with no husband present, and 29.9% were non-families. 25.4% of all households were made up of individuals, and 10.0% had someone living alone who was 65 years of age or older.  The average household size was 2.62 and the average family size was 3.16.

In the village, the population was spread out, with 28.2% under the age of 18, 12.4% from 18 to 24, 26.5% from 25 to 44, 20.1% from 45 to 64, and 12.7% who were 65 years of age or older.  The median age was 32 years. For every 100 females, there were 93.6 males.  For every 100 females age 18 and over, there were 90.7 males.

The median income for a household in the village was $33,375, and the median income for a family was $37,917. Males had a median income of $34,286 versus $21,111 for females. The per capita income for the village was $15,281.  About 10.1% of families and 11.3% of the population were below the poverty line, including 12.6% of those under age 18 and 6.9% of those age 65 or over.

Climate
This climatic region has large seasonal temperature differences, with warm to hot (and often humid) summers and cold (sometimes severely cold) winters.  According to the Köppen Climate Classification system, Mayville has a humid continental climate, abbreviated "Dfb" on climate maps.

References

External links
Village website

Villages in Tuscola County, Michigan
Villages in Michigan
Populated places established in 1865